General Fessenden may refer to:

Francis Fessenden (1839–1906), Union Army major general
James Deering Fessenden (1833–1882), Union Army brigadier general and brevet major general
Samuel Fessenden (1784–1869), Massachusetts State Militia major general